VD may refer to:

Arts and entertainment 
 The Vampire Diaries
 Ivan Vdović (1960–1992), Serbian drummer
 Veni Domine, a Swedish metal band
 Vicious Delite, a metal band featuring Ratt's Stephen Pearcy

Holidays 
 Valentine's Day, a holiday
 Veterans Day, a holiday
 Victory Day, a public holiday in several countries

Science and technology 
 Vd, design diving speed for an aircraft, see V speeds for further information
 Vaginal delivery, a natural birth
 Vapour density, the density of a vapor in relation to that of hydrogen
 Venereal disease, now more commonly known as sexually transmitted disease or sexually transmitted infection
 Virtual desktop, expansion of the space of a computer's desktop environment beyond the physical limits of the screen
 Virtual directory, in computing
 Visual design
 Volume of distribution (VD)
 Volumetric Display
 Videodisc

Other uses 
 Van der (v.d.), a prefix in Dutch language surnames
 Vaud, a canton in Switzerland
 , an abbreviation of the Spanish personal pronoun 
 Volunteer Officers' Decoration, a Crown honour or long-service award made to auxiliary army officers of the British Empire between 1894 and 1931
 Volga-Dnepr Airlines, Russian cargo airline
 Henan Airlines (IATA code VD), former Chinese airline
 Victoria Dockside

See also 
 Vroom & Dreesmann (V&D), a former Dutch retail chain
 495 (number), in roman numerals can be represented as "VD" (500-5)